Beevers is an English surname.  Notable people with this name include:

Ben Beevers (born ), English rugby player
C. Arnold Beevers (1908–2001), British crystallographer
Geoffrey Beevers (born 1941), British actor
Harry Beevers (1924–2004), American plant physiologist
James Beevers (born 1979), British fencer
Joe Beevers (born 1967), English poker player
Lee Beevers (born 1983), British footballer
Mark Beevers (born 1989), English footballer who plays defender
Martin Beevers (born 1946), British fencer

See also
Beever

English-language surnames
Surnames from nicknames